The Lost River is a  tributary of the Clearwater River of northwestern Minnesota in the United States.  Via the Clearwater River, the Red Lake River, the Red River of the North, Lake Winnipeg, and the Nelson River, it is part of the watershed of Hudson Bay.

Lost River was named from the fact it once passed under a bog until the bogs were drained.

See also
List of rivers of Minnesota

References

Minnesota Watersheds

USGS Hydrologic Unit Map - State of Minnesota (1974)

Rivers of Red Lake County, Minnesota
Rivers of Polk County, Minnesota
Rivers of Clearwater County, Minnesota
Rivers of Minnesota
Tributaries of Hudson Bay